Geminispora is a genus of fungi in the family Phyllachoraceae; according to the 2007 Outline of Ascomycota, the placement in this family is uncertain.

Distribution
It is only recorded as being found in the Caribbean and South America.

Species
As accepted by Species Fungorum;
Geminispora derridis 
Geminispora mimosae

References

External links
Index Fungorum

Sordariomycetes genera
Phyllachorales